El Camino Christmas is a 2017 American comedy directed by David E. Talbert and written by Theodore Melfi and Christopher Wehner. The film stars Luke Grimes,
Vincent D'Onofrio,  Dax Shepard, Kurtwood Smith, Michelle Mylett, Emilio Rivera, Kimberly Quinn, Jessica Alba, Tim Allen and Jimmy O. Yang. The film was released on Netflix on December 8, 2017.

Plot
A young man (Luke Grimes) seeks out a father (Tim Allen) he has never met and ends up barricaded in a liquor store with five other people on Christmas Eve. There is much turmoil, and back and forth between all involved. After an extended shootout, a “hero” emerges.

Cast  
 Luke Grimes as Eric Norris
 Tim Allen as Larry Roth
 Vincent D'Onofrio as Carl Hooker
 Dax Shepard as Deputy Billy Calhoun
 Kurtwood Smith as Bob Fuller, Sheriff of El Camino County
 Michelle Mylett as Kate Daniels
 Emilio Rivera as Vicente Santos
 Kimberly Quinn as Jewels Daniels
 Jessica Alba as Beth Flowers
 Jimmy O. Yang as Mike the Cameraman

Production
According to screenwriter Theodore Melfi, the project had been in development for ten years before principal photography began on May 1, 2017 in Los Angeles.

Release
The film was released on Netflix on December 8, 2017.

Reception
According to the review aggregator website Rotten Tomatoes, 40% of critics have given the film a positive review based on 5 reviews, with an average rating of 2.73/10.

References

External links
 
 

2017 films
2010s English-language films
2017 black comedy films
American Christmas films
English-language Netflix original films
Films shot in Los Angeles
American black comedy films
Films directed by David E. Talbert
Films scored by Christopher Lennertz
2010s Christmas films
2010s American films